Tamara Novikova (born June 6, 1932 at Irkutsk, USSR) is a former female cyclist from the Soviet Union.

Novikova broke the women's World Record for 1 hour on July 7, 1955 when she covered 38.473 km, breaking the mark of Italian Alfonsina Strada that had stood for 26 years.

Novikova took the silver medal in the first UCI Road World Championships - Women's Road Race at Reims, France in 1958. She finished behind Elsy Jacobs of Luxembourg.

On the 'Cycling Rankings 1958 - 2006' she was ranked 45th.

References

1932 births
Living people
Russian female cyclists
Soviet female cyclists
Sportspeople from Irkutsk